The 1903 Newmarket by-election was a parliamentary by-election held on 2 January 1903 to fill a vacancy in the United Kingdom House of Commons for the Eastern or Newmarket Division of Cambridgeshire.

Vacancy
The vacancy occurred with the sudden death of the sitting Conservative Member of Parliament, Colonel Harry McCalmont on 8 December 1902. McCalmont had been MP for Newmarket since 1895.

Electoral history
At the previous election, in 1900, he had been returned with a majority of 1,077 votes.

The candidates and campaign
Nominations for the election were made on 26 December 1902. There were two candidates: Leonard Brassey for the Conservatives, and Charles Rose for the Liberals. Rose had also contested the seat in 1900. Both candidates were involved in the horse racing industry, the major employer in and around the town of Newmarket.

An important factor in the election was the religious beliefs of the candidates. The Church Association, an evangelical Protestant organisation, interrogated both of the men. Rose stated that he strenuously supported Protestant principles and opposed any legislation that would undermine the ascendency of Protestantism. This satisfied the Association, and was probably responsible for a large number of Evangelical Christian voters switching allegiance from the Conservatives to the Liberals.

Polling and result
The election took place on Friday 2 January 1903. The poll was heavy and motor cars were widely used to bring voters to the polls.

The result of the election was announced on Saturday 3 January at Cambridge Shire Hall. Rose won the seat for the Liberals by a majority of 507 votes.

Aftermath
Rose held the seat at the ensuing election in 1906. 

Brassey subsequently became MP for North Northamptonshire in 1910.

See also
 List of United Kingdom by-elections (1900–1918)

References

Newmarket, Suffolk
1903 elections in the United Kingdom
1903 in England
By-elections to the Parliament of the United Kingdom in Cambridgeshire constituencies
Newmarket